An election was held on November 2, 2010 to elect all 100 members to Montana's House of Representatives. The election coincided with elections for other offices, including U.S. Senate, U.S. House of Representatives and State Senate. The primary election was held on June 8, 2010.

A loss of 18 seats by the Democrats resulted in the Republicans winning 68 seats compared to 32 seats for the Democrats. Republicans regained control of the House after two years of Democratic control.

Results

Statewide
Statewide results of the 2010 Montana House of Representatives election:

District
Results of the 2010 Montana House of Representatives election by district:

References

House of Representatives
Montana House of Representatives
2010